Michał Witkowski (born 17 January 1975, in Wrocław, Poland) is a Polish novelist.

Life and career

His first "official" work, Copyright, published in 2001, was a collection of short stories. However, he had previously published, Zgorszeni wstają od stołów in 1997 as Michał S. Witkowski, with the S. standing for Sebastian.

On December 17, 2004, Lubiewo was published — a radically queer novel that sold an estimated 15,000 copies. The novel has been translated into German, English (Lovetown), Spanish, Dutch, Finnish (2007), French, Russian, Czech, Lithuanian, Ukrainian, Slovenian (2010) and Hungarian (2010). His next collection of stories Fototapeta (Photo-wallpaper) was published in 2006 by W.A.B. More recently, Witkowski has published two "queer crime novels", in which a gay writer named Michał Witkowski acts as first-person narrator and detective: Drwal (The Woodcutter, 2011) and Zbrodniarz i dziewczyna (The Criminal and the Girl, 2014).

Witkowski was nominated three times for the Nike Award, Poland's best-known literary award: in 2006 for Lubiewo (shortlist), in 2007 for Barbara Radziwiłłówna z Jaworzna-Szczakowej (longlist), and in 2012 for Drwal (longlist). Lubiewo won the Gdynia Literary Prize in 2006, and Barbara Radziwiłłówna z Jaworzna-Szczakowej was awarded the Paszport Polityki in 2007. Lovetown, the English translation of Lubiewo was longlisted for the Independent Foreign Fiction Prize in 2011.

He is a permanent contributor of Ha!art, a Polish cultural magazine and since July 2014 a contributor to Wprost, having previously worked for six years for Polityka. He is also author of a fashion blog, Fashion Pathology.

Personal life
He describes himself as a homosexual. He rejects the label "gay" as a personal identity as referring to a subculture in the queer community, those commonly represented by popular culture.

Works 
 Copyright (2001).  Wydawnictwo Zielona Sowa, 
 Lubiewo (2005). Korporacja ha!art, 
 Fototapeta (2006). Wydawnictwo W.A.B., 
 Barbara Radziwiłłówna z Jaworzna-Szczakowej (2007). Wydawnictwo "W.A.B.", 
 Margot (2009). Wydawnictwo "Świat Książki", 
 Drwal (2011). Wydawnictwo "Świat Książki", 
 Lubiewo bez cenzury (Lubiewo uncensored) (2012).  Wydawnictwo "Świat Książki", 
 Zbrodniarz i dziewczyna (2014). Wydawnictwo "Świat Książki", 
 Fynf und cfancyś (2015). Wydawnictwo "Znak", 
 Wymazane (2017). Wydawnictwo "Znak"

See also
Polish literature
List of Polish writers

References

External links
 Michał Witkowski (Polish website, with some content in English)

1975 births
Living people
Writers from Wrocław
Polish LGBT novelists
Gay novelists
21st-century Polish novelists
Polish male novelists
21st-century Polish male writers